Etimesgut Air Base  is an airbase of the Turkish Air Force located  west of Ankara, Turkey. It is owned by Turkish Air Force and jointly operated by the air force and the Turkish Aeronautical Association (THK). International Defense Industry, Aerospace and Maritime Fair (IDEF) and civil aviation airshows are being held at this airport.

The airport has two runway in east–west direction. The northern part of the airport, limited by the urban section of Ankara-Istanbul highway  at north, is assigned to the military with the longer runway 11L/29R. The southern area and the shorter runway 11R/29L are being used by the THK. The Ankara Aviation Museum, open to public, is located at the northeastern corner of the airport.

11th Air Logistics Command
The 11th Air Logistics Command, a direct subunit of the General Staff of the Turkish Air Force, is stationed at the Etimesgut Air Base with two squadrons having their military transport aircraft for cargo and personnel.
 
 211th Squadron ("Gezgin")
CASA CN-235M-100 airplanes for cargo and ambulance and CASA CN-235EW airplanes for electronic warfare.

 212th Special Squadron ("Doğan")
Cessna 550, Cessna 650, Gulfstream IV, CASA CN-235M-100 airplanes and Bell UH-1H helicopters for personnel transport.

Turkish Aeronautical Association
The airport hosts the Etimesgut Türkkuşu Training Center of the Turkish Aeronautical Association, which was established on May 3, 1935. The center consists of flight schools, maintenance and logistics facilities and ground support units.

The center flies the aircraft: Antonov An-2, Cessna 402, Cessna 421, Dornier Do 28, Norman NAC6, PZL-Mielec M-18 Dromader and PZL-104 Wilga.

Other airports in Ankara
 Esenboğa International Airport
 Akıncı Air Base
 Güvercinlik Army Air Base

References

External links
 

Turkish Air Force bases
Airports in Turkey
Buildings and structures in Ankara
Military in Ankara
Transport in Ankara Province
Etimesgut District